Doin' It Old School Style (also title as Doin' It Old School Style: Live at Club U) is a double-live album released on May 8, 2001 by the Washington, D.C.-based go-go band Rare Essence. The album was recorded live on September 9, 2000 at Club U, a music venue located on the historic U Street in Northwest, Washington, D.C., and includes the go-go rendition of Sade's song "No Ordinary Love".

The album's cover art is a throwback 80s-styled event poster which includes names of the former go-go clubs from around the Washington metropolitan area (such as Howard Theatre, Celebrity Hall (aka "The Black Hole") and the Coliseum).

Track listing
Disc 1
"The 'In' Crowd" (written by Billy Page) – 9:28
"Hey Buddy Buddy" (written by Michael Neal, J. Karen Thomas) – 7:43
"Get on the Wagon" – 8:01
"Cherchez la R.E." (featuring Ms. Kim)– 7:45
"Take Me Out to the Go-Go" – 10:06
"One on One" – 7:20
"Mickey's Solo" – 3:58
"Lock It" (written by Michael Neal, J. Karen Thomas) – 15:11
"No Ordinary Love" (written by Sade Adu, Stuart Matthewman) – 4:22

Disc 2
"Live concert video" – 47:17

Personnel
James "Jas Funk" Thomas – lead vocals
Andre "Whiteboy" Johnson – electric guitar, vocals
Milton "Go-Go Mickey" Freeman – congas, timbales, percussions
Mike Baker – bass guitar
Donnell Floyd – tenor saxophone, vocals
Byron "BJ" Jackson – keyboards, vocals
Kent Wood – keyboards
Michael Smith – drums
Ms. Kim – vocals

References

External links
Doin' It Old School Style at Discogs

2001 live albums
Rare Essence albums